Sara Brita Nina Dano (born 12 June 2000) is a Swedish handballer for HH Elite and the Swedish national team.

She represented Sweden at the 2020 European Women's Handball Championship.

Achievements 
Svensk handbollselit:
Winner: 2019

References

External links

2000 births
Living people
Handball players from Gothenburg
Swedish female handball players
IK Sävehof players
Handball players at the 2020 Summer Olympics
Olympic handball players of Sweden